The Shelby Gem Factory was the production facility of ICT Incorporated, a company in Shelby, Michigan, United States, that manufactured artificial gemstones through proprietary processes. ICT began operations in 1970 and closed in December 2019.

History

Larry Paul Kelley established ICT (International Crystal Technology) in 1970 with Craig Hardy and Tom VanBergen. Kelley had worked for Dow Chemical in Ludington and at a factory in Ann Arbor that produced laser crystals. The facility was sited in Shelby because the town had a new industrial park. By 2015, Kelley was ICT's sole owner.

For a time, cubic zirconia was a lucrative product line; Shelby opened factories outside the United States to keep up with demand.

A 50-seat theater ran a presentation for visitors and jewelry was sold on site.

The factory closed in 2019 after Kelley was diagnosed in 2017 with Alzheimer's disease. Other issues that contributed to the closing were worldwide competition and online markets. Larry Kelley died on October 24, 2020.

Manufacturing 

Factory tours were discontinued due to liability concerns attendant to the "very high temperatures and extremely bright light" and the unavailability of affordable insurance to cover the risk.

The gems were synthesized in a furnace. The Shelby Gem Factory's diamonds were simulants. The factory also manufactured simulated citrine and topaz, along with other birthstone substitutes.

See also 

 Czochralski method
 Skull crucible

References

Further reading

External links 

 
 Shelby Gem Factory visit
 ICT YouTube video on explanation of semiconductor invention for making solar cells

Defunct technology companies of the United States
American inventions
Economy of Michigan
Gemological laboratories
Oceana County, Michigan
Physical chemistry
Science and technology in Michigan
Solar cells
Synthetic minerals
1970 establishments in Michigan
2019 disestablishments in Michigan
Manufacturing companies based in Michigan